Jasper Löffelsend (born 10 September 1997) is a German professional footballer who plays as a midfielder for Real Salt Lake in Major League Soccer.

Career

Early career
Löffelsend played with various teams at youth level, including spells at SV Bergisch Gladbach 09, SV Union Rösrath and TV Herkenrath 09. Following his time at Herkenrath, he had short spells with SV Straelen, Bonner SC, FC Hennef 05 and FC Wegberg-Beeck, appearing for the teams in both the Regionalliga West and Mittelrheinliga. After signing with Wegberg-Beeck in July 2020, Löffelsend and the club mutually agreed to terminate his contract to allow him to accept a scholarship to play college soccer in the United States.

College
Löffelsend attended the University of Pittsburgh in 2020, where he played two seasons, making a total of 36 appearances, scoring two goals and tallying 19 assists. In his two seasons with the Panthers, he was named All-ACC First Team twice, ACC Defensive Player of the Year twice, was a MAC Hermann Trophy semi-finalist twice, TopDrawerSoccer Best XI First Team, United Soccer Coaches South All-Region First Team twice, United Soccer Coaches Second Team All-America twice, and College Soccer News First Team All-America.

MLS 
On 11 January 2022, Löeffelsend  was selected 81st overall in the 2022 MLS SuperDraft by Real Salt Lake. On 22 February 2022, he signed with Salt Lake's MLS Next Pro side Real Monarchs. However, on 27 February 2022, it was announced that Löeffelsend had signed a one-year deal with Real Salt Lake's first team who compete in Major League Soccer. He made his debut for the club the same day, appearing as an injury-time substitute during a 0–0 draw with Houston Dynamo.

References

External links 
 
 Jasper Löeffelsend | Real Salt Lake

1997 births
Living people
Association football defenders
Bonner SC players
Expatriate soccer players in the United States
FC Hennef 05 players
FC Wegberg-Beeck players
German expatriate footballers
German expatriate sportspeople in the United States
German footballers
Major League Soccer players
Pittsburgh Panthers men's soccer players
Real Monarchs players
Real Salt Lake draft picks
Real Salt Lake players
SV Bergisch Gladbach 09 players
SV 19 Straelen players
Footballers from Cologne